Chetan Morar Patel (born 12 April 1972 in Islington, London) is a former English cricketer who played first-class and List A cricket for Hampshire in 1997, as well as playing at the first-class level for Oxford University. In 1999 he appeared in one List A game for the Middlesex Cricket Board side.

In May 1997, playing for Oxford against Warwickshire at The University Parks, Patel became the first player to take a first-class hat-trick for the university in thirty years.

Notes

References
 
 

English cricketers
Hampshire cricketers
Oxford University cricketers
1972 births
Living people
Middlesex Cricket Board cricketers
Alumni of Keble College, Oxford
British sportspeople of Indian descent
British Asian cricketers